Numbers: The Universal Language is a 1996 illustrated monograph on numbers and their history. Written by the French historian of science Denis Guedj, and published in pocket format by Éditions Gallimard as the  volume in their "Découvertes" collection (known as "Abrams Discoveries" in the United States, and "New Horizons" in the United Kingdom). The book was adapted into a documentary film of the same title in 2001.

Introduction 

The book is part of the  series (formerly belonging to  series) in the "Découvertes Gallimard" collection. As a work of popularisation of mathematics, it uses simple language to describe the basics of numbers—arithmetic, integer, natural number, concepts of zero and infinity—as well as how numbers and their symbolism came to be used in art and other disciplines.

According to the tradition of "Découvertes", which is based on an abundant pictorial documentation and a way of bringing together visual documents and texts, enhanced by printing on coated paper, as commented in L'Express, "genuine monographs, published like art books". It's almost like a "graphic novel", replete with colour plates.

Contents 
The book opens with a "trailer", that is, a series of full-page photographs showing The Powers of Ten. The body text is divided into seven chapters:

 Chapter 1: "How Many?";
 Chapter 2: "From Numbers to Figures";
 Chapter 3: "Positional Notation";
 Chapter 4: "Natural Numbers";
 Chapter 5: "The Universe Expands";
 Chapter 6: "From Zero to Infinity";
 Chapter 7: "The Impossible Definition".

The second part of the book, the "Documents", containing a compilation of excerpts divided into nine parts:

 Counting;
 Against Pythagoras, Against Zeno;
 Numbers and religion;
 Numbers, philosophy, and poetry;
 The science of measurement;
 The abacus and calculator;
 Music and mathematics;
 Number and psychology;
 The wit and wisdom of numbers.
 Amusing Puzzle;
 Glossary;
 Chronology;
 Further Reading;
 List of Illustrations;
 Index.

Reception 
On Babelio, the book gets an average of 3.0/5 based on 11 ratings. Goodreads reported, based on 66 ratings, an average of 3.61 out of 5, indicating "generally positive opinions".

Adaptation 
In 2001, the book was adapted as an documentary film of the same name. A co-production between La Sept-Arte and Trans Europe Film, with the collaboration of Éditions Gallimard and CNRS Images Média, the film was directed by Philippe Truffault, with voice-over narration by Denis Guedj himself. It was broadcast on Arte as part of the television programme The Human Adventure, and released on DVD by Arte vidéo, with English dubbed audio. The film has also been dubbed into German by the title .

See also 
 Number theory
 Mathematics and art
 The Parrot's Theorem

References

External links 
  
 

1996 non-fiction books
Books about mathematics
Non-fiction books adapted into films
Découvertes Gallimard
2001 documentary films
French documentary television films
Documentary films about mathematics
2000s French films